Whites Creek is a stream in the U.S. state of West Virginia.

Whites Creek was named after one Mr. White, the proprietor of a local gristmill.

See also
List of rivers of West Virginia

References

Rivers of Wayne County, West Virginia
Rivers of West Virginia